The Meghalaya Legislative Assembly is the unicameral legislature of the Indian state of Meghalaya.

Constituted as a directly elected body in 1972, it has 60 members, filled through direct elections held every five years. Like other Indian states, Meghalaya has a parliamentary system of government. The executive branch of the Meghalaya Government is derived from the Legislative Assembly.

History
In independent India, the areas now constituting the state of Meghalaya were part of the state of Assam and represented in the Assam Legislative Assembly. The Indian Parliament passed the Assam Reorganisation (Meghalaya) Act in 1969, which led to the establishment of an autonomous state of Meghalaya within Assam on 2 April 1970. A legislature of 37 members for the new autonomous state was established, with representatives elected indirectly by the autonomous direct councils. The first sitting of the assembly took place in Tura on 14 April 1970. In 1971, the Indian Parliament passed the North-Eastern Areas (Reorganisation) Act, which converted Meghalaya from an autonomous state within Assam to a full member state of the Indian Union. The State of Meghalaya was officially formed on 21 January 1972. The Legislative Assembly was then reconstituted as a directly elected body.

The regions of Meghalaya are represented in the Assembly, with 29 members elected from Khasi Hills, 7 from Jaintia Hills and 24 from Garo Hills.

List of Assemblies
The following is the list of all the Meghalaya Legislative Assemblies:

Committees
There are 15 committees in the Legislative Assembly of Meghalaya:

Business Advisory Committee: decides the time-table for assembly functions and for evaluation of legislation.
Committee on Petitions: responsible for examining petitions submitted to the assembly, collecting evidence and preparing reports.
Committee on Public Accounts: examines the budget, appropriations and auditing of state agencies, programmes and government.
Committee on Public Undertakings: responsible for monitoring and improving the workings of public sector undertakings such as government corporations, housing programmes and economic development schemes.
Committee on Estimates: evaluates statistics and estimates to improve the efficiency and administration of various government functions, agencies and programmes.
Committee Welfare of the Scheduled Tribes & Scheduled Castes: responsible for monitoring programmes aimed for the economic and social development of the scheduled castes, tribes and backward classes residing in the state of Meghalaya.
Committee of Privileges: examines any issues and violations of the privileges, conduct and benefits given to members of the assembly.
Committee on Subordinate Legislation: monitors if the state government's functions and legislation comply with the state constitution.
Committee on Government Assurances: monitors the reliability and fulfillment of targets and promises made by the chief minister and cabinet ministers.
Rules Committee: maintains the rules of business and code of conduct for members of the assembly.
House Committee: oversees the amenities for members of the assembly such as housing, food, health-care and transport.
Library Committee: is responsible for the maintenance and development of the state government and assembly library.
Select Committee: is charged with the examination and development of specific legislation, preparing it for final passage.
Committee on the Empowerment of Women: oversees schemes and programmes aimed to increase representation of women in society and economic sectors.
Budget Committee: examines budget proposals for various organs and departments of the state government.

Members

Notes

See also 

 11th Meghalaya Assembly

References

 
State legislatures of India